The 2017–18 Delaware Fightin' Blue Hens men's basketball team represented the University of Delaware during the 2017–18 NCAA Division I men's basketball season. The Fightin' Blue Hens, led by second-year head coach Martin Ingelsby, played their home games at the Bob Carpenter Center in Newark, Delaware as members of the Colonial Athletic Association. They finished the season 14–19, 6–12 in CAA play to finish in a four-way tie for seventh place. They defeated Elon in the first round of the CAA tournament before losing in the quarterfinals to Northeastern.

Previous season 
The Fightin' Blue Hens finished the 2016–17 season 13–20, 5–13 in CAA play to finish in ninth place. They defeated Hofstra in the first round of the CAA tournament to advance to the quarterfinals where they lost to UNC Wilmington.

Offseason

Departures

Incoming transfers

Recruiting class of 2017

Recruiting class of 2018

Roster

Schedule and results

|-
!colspan=9 style=| Non-conference regular season

|-
!colspan=9 style=| CAA regular season

|-
!colspan=9 style=| CAA tournament

See also
2017–18 Delaware Fightin' Blue Hens women's basketball team

References

Delaware Fightin' Blue Hens men's basketball seasons
Delaware
Delaware Fightin' Blue Hens men's b
Delaware Fightin' Blue Hens men's b